Evangelical Lutheran Diocese of Norway is a Lutheran diocese in Norway, founded in Kautokeino in 2013. Branched out from the "Church of Norway in Exile" (formerly the Deanery of Strandebarm), the bishop of the diocese is Thor Henrik With.

The diocese co-operates with the Mission Province of Sweden and the Evangelical Lutheran Mission Diocese of Finland through the Communion of Nordic Lutheran Dioceses. The three dioceses have altar and pulpit fellowship.

References 

Christian organizations established in 2013
2013 establishments in Norway
Lutheran denominations
History of Christianity in Norway
Lutheranism in Norway